Haight Township is a civil township of Ontonagon County in the U.S. state of Michigan. The population was 203 at the 2020 census.

Communities
 Paulding is an unincorporated community within the township.

Geography

Demographics
As of the census of 2000, there were 228 people, 96 households, and 69 families residing in the township. The population density was 2.2 per square mile (0.8/km2). There were 241 housing units at an average density of 2.3 per square mile (0.9/km2). The racial makeup of the township was 94.74% White, 1.32% Asian, 1.32% from other races, and 2.63% from two or more races. Hispanic or Latino of any race were 3.07% of the population.

There were 96 households, out of which 21.9% had children under the age of 18 living with them, 65.6% were married couples living together, 4.2% had a female householder with no husband present, and 28.1% were non-families. 22.9% of all households were made up of individuals, and 12.5% had someone living alone who was 65 years of age or older. The average household size was 2.38 and the average family size was 2.84.

In the township the population was spread out, with 18.9% under the age of 18, 7.5% from 18 to 24, 23.7% from 25 to 44, 28.1% from 45 to 64, and 21.9% who were 65 years of age or older. The median age was 45 years. For every 100 females, there were 128.0 males. For every 100 females age 18 and over, there were 117.6 males.

The median income for a household in the township was $30,104, and the median income for a family was $33,438. Males had a median income of $26,875 versus $17,500 for females. The per capita income for the township was $14,980. About 5.9% of families and 11.0% of the population were below the poverty line, including 15.5% of those under the age of eighteen and none of those 65 or over.

References

Townships in Ontonagon County, Michigan
Townships in Michigan